José Luis Muñoz Muñoz (born 24 July 1987) is Chilean footballer who plays for C.D. Arturo Fernández Vial in the Primera B de Chile.

He scored an important goal against Lanús in the 2009 Copa Libertadores, to make the score 2–1 in a historic victory by which Everton became the first Chilean team to defeat an Argentine opponent.

Honours

Club
Universidad Catolica
 Primera División de Chile (1): 2016 Apertura
 Supercopa de Chile (1): 2016

Santiago Wanderers
 Copa Chile (1): 2017

Palestino
 Copa Chile (1): 2018

References

External links

José Luis Muñoz at Football Lineups
José Luis Muñoz at playmakerstats.com (English version of ceroacero.es)

1987 births
Living people
People from Rancagua
Chilean footballers
Deportes Colchagua footballers
Magallanes footballers
Deportes Magallanes footballers
Everton de Viña del Mar footballers
Ñublense footballers
Club Deportivo Universidad Católica footballers
Santiago Wanderers footballers
Club Deportivo Palestino footballers
O'Higgins F.C. footballers
Deportes Melipilla footballers
C.D. Arturo Fernández Vial footballers
Chilean Primera División players
Tercera División de Chile players 
Primera B de Chile players
Association football forwards